Sisyra vicaria is a species of spongillaflies in the family Sisyridae. It is found in North America.

References

 Bowles, David E. (2006). "Spongillaflies (Neuroptera: Sisyridae) of North America with a key to the larvae and adults".
 Penny, Norman D., Philip A. Adams, and Lionel A. Stange (1997). "Species catalog of the Neuroptera, Megaloptera, and Raphidioptera of America North of Mexico". Proceedings of the California Academy of Sciences, vol. 50, no. 3, 39-114.

Further reading

 Arnett, Ross H. (2000). American Insects: A Handbook of the Insects of America North of Mexico. CRC Press.

External links

Hemerobiiformia